Peter Rasmussen (born 2 March 1969) is a retired Danish professional football player in the midfielder position. He spent his entire 13-year career with Akademisk Boldklub (AB), winning the 1999 Danish Cup with the team. Rasmussen played 141 games and scored 15 goals in the Danish Superliga championship from 1996 to 2000.

References

External links

1969 births
Living people
Akademisk Boldklub players
Danish men's footballers
Association football midfielders
People from Hillerød Municipality
Sportspeople from the Capital Region of Denmark